Clanculus largillierti is a species of sea snail, a marine gastropod mollusk in the family Trochidae, the top snails.

Description
The height of the shell attains 14 mm, its diameter 16 mm. The  perforate shell has a conoid shape with an acute apex and 6½ whorls.,The first whorl is rosy, the following whorls convex, grayish, spotted with white and black at the narrow sutures. They are spirally lirate with numerous granulose lirae, 8 to 10 on the penultimate whorl. The body whorl is rounded, concentrically lirate beneath with 8 to 10 lirae, gray and brown articulated. The oblique aperture is rhomboidal. The lip is dentate above. The basal margin is plicate. The oblique columella is dentate at its base. The parietal callus is wrinkled. The umbilicus is bordered by strong white plicae.

Distribution
This species occurs in the Indian Ocean off Réunion.

References

External links
 To Biodiversity Heritage Library (1 publication)
 To World Register of Marine Species
 

largillierti
Gastropods described in 1849
Taxa named by Rodolfo Amando Philippi